Güzelyayla (former Soğukoluk) is a village in Hatay Province, Turkey.

The population of the village was 421 as of 2017.
Güzelyayla is situated in the western slopes of Nur Mountains and overlooks the Iskenderun Gulf. It is a typical summer resort. (see Yayla (resort)). Tourism is the main economic sector of the village.

References

Villages in Hatay Province